D507 is a state road in Hrvatsko Zagorje region of Croatia connecting the D205 state road near Gubaševo to the D206 state road near Pregrada and Krapinske Toplice.

The road, as well as all other state roads in Croatia, is managed and maintained by Hrvatske ceste, state owned company.

Traffic volume 

Traffic is regularly counted and reported by Hrvatske ceste, operator of the road.

Road junctions and populated areas

Sources

State roads in Croatia
Krapina-Zagorje County